The Wave is a residential skyscraper with an unusual appearance on the Gold Coast, Australia. It is located at the corner of Surf Parade and Victoria Avenue, Broadbeach.

The innovative structure features reinforced concrete balconies that create a flowing, waveform exterior. The design ensures each of the 118 apartment's balconies receive a mix of shade and sunlight. The tower features basement parking, a podium, three levels of commercial space and another level with recreation facilities. One, two and three bedroom apartments a found from floor five above.

In 2007, the building was featured in a Bollywood movie called Singh Is Kinng.

References

External links
Broadbeach Accommodation At The Wave Official Website

Residential buildings completed in 2006
Skyscrapers on the Gold Coast, Queensland
Broadbeach, Queensland
2006 establishments in Australia
Residential skyscrapers in Australia
Retail buildings in Queensland